Deivid Willian da Silva (born 18 January 1989), simply known as Deivid, is a Brazilian footballer who plays as a defensive midfielder for Vila Nova.

Club career
Born in Londrina, Paraná, Deivid joined Atlético Paranaense's youth setup in 2005, aged 16, after starting it out at hometown's Paraná Soccer Technical Center. On 30 May 2010 he made his first team – and Série A – debut, playing the last 26 minutes of a 1–4 away loss against Internacional.

Deivid only scored his first senior goal on 8 February 2012, netting the first of a 4–0 home routing over Toledo Colônia Work for the Campeonato Paranaense championship. On 1 October 2014 he renewed his link with Furacão, running until December 2018.

Career statistics

References

External links
Atlético Paranaense profile 

1989 births
Living people
Sportspeople from Londrina
Brazilian footballers
Association football midfielders
Campeonato Brasileiro Série A players
Campeonato Brasileiro Série B players
Club Athletico Paranaense players
Sport Club do Recife players
Guarani FC players